Minás Alozídis (born 7 July 1984) is a Greek and Cypriot hurdler. He competes in the 200m and 400m hurdles events. Representing Greece, he finished 7th in the 400m hurdles final at the 2006 European Athletics Championships in Gothenburg. At the 2009 Games of the Small States of Europe, he won gold medals in the 400 metres hurdles and 4 x 400 metres relay, while representing Cyprus.

References

1984 births
Living people
Greek male hurdlers
Cypriot male hurdlers
People from Trikala (regional unit)
Sportspeople from Thessaly